Atenienses de Manatí may refer to:
 Atenienses de Manatí (baseball)
 Atenienses de Manatí (basketball)